Kikuchi (written:  or ) is a Japanese surname. Notable people with the surname include:

, Japanese singer, actress, model and idol, former member of AKB48
, Japanese speed skater
, Japanese mathematician, educator, and education administrator
, Japanese footballer
, Japanese writer
, Japanese footballer
, Japanese composer
, Japanese painter
Kokoro Kikuchi (born 1982) Japanese voice actress
, Japanese idol and actor
, Japanese voice actress
, Japanese actress, voice actress and singer
, Japanese musician, singer, model and actress
, Japanese actress, entertainer, singer, and scholar
, Japanese footballer
, Japanese actress
, Japanese classical pianist
, Japanese professional baseball player
, Japanese footballer
, Japanese rower
, Japanese handball player
, Japanese physicist
, Japanese voice actress
, Japanese composer
, Japanese footballer
, Japanese speed skater
, Japanese industrial and fashion designer
, Japanese professional wrestler
, Japanese Go player
, Japanese painter
, Japanese footballer
, general authority of The Church of Jesus Christ of Latter-day Saints
, Japanese speed skater
, Japanese baseball player

See also
Kikuchi clan, a Japanese clan

Japanese-language surnames